Riccardo Scimeca (born 13 June 1975) is an English football coach and professional footballer.

He who played as a defender notably in the Premier League for Aston Villa, Leicester City and West Bromwich Albion. He also played in the Football League for both Nottingham Forest and Cardiff City in a career spanning 16 years, making over 400 appearances. During his career, he also attained one cap for the England B team. Although working away from football since his retirement, he returned to the sport in 2015 as a youth team coach for Solihull Moors.

Career

Aston Villa
Scimeca started his career at Aston Villa, coming through the club's youth system, as a central defender and was largely a squad player until his move to Nottingham Forest in 1999 for £2.5 million.

Nottingham Forest
He spent four seasons at the City Ground, and took over as captain when Steve Chettle left in his first season. However Chris Bart-Williams was appointed captain the following season. Scimeca was consistent and reliable in his spell at Forest, playing in various positions. He featured regularly in central defence and midfield, but also had spells at right back and right-midfield. He scored 4 goals in his second season. In the 2001–02 season he formed a solid defensive partnership with Jon Olav Hjelde. In 2002–03, his last season, in which Forest made the play-offs, Paul Hart deployed him in a defensive midfield role within a diamond 4–4–2 formation. He scored 4 goals during this season, and played a prominent role throughout his four years at the club.

Leicester City and West Bromwich Albion
He moved on to Leicester City in 2003, on a free transfer after failing to agree a new deal. At Leicester he scored once in a 4–3 defeat to Wolverhampton Wanderers on 25 October 2003. Scimeca then moved to West Bromwich Albion a year later by activating a get-out clause in his contract which allowed him to leave Leicester, before his transfer to Cardiff City in early 2006.

Cardiff City
In his first year at Ninian Park, Scimeca became an important part of the Cardiff side under manager Dave Jones and also developed something of a goal scoring touch which he admitted surprised him. At the beginning of the 2007–08 season he was sidelined with a groin injury and started the season on the treatment table. He attempted a comeback in August in a reserve match against Plymouth Argyle but only lasted twelve minutes after suffering a recurrence of the injury. He again came close to a return in December 2007 after having an operation on his groin injury but suffered another setback after he contracted the MRSA bacteria after the incision failed to fully heal. He made his long-awaited return for Cardiff on 19 February 2008, by playing for 45 minutes against Newport County in the FAW Premier Cup, his first appearance for the Bluebirds for nearly a year. He went on to make a total of 11 appearances in all competitions during the season, mostly as a substitute to return to match fitness.

The start of the 2008–09 season looked to be more promising for Scimeca as he began the season fully fit and an injury to Gavin Rae saw him back into the first team early in the year, but he went on to suffer another injury setback after seriously damaging ankle ligaments during a 2–1 victory over Milton Keynes Dons in the second round of the Football League Cup. He returned to the squad for the first time on 22 November 2008 when he was named on the bench for a 2–1 defeat against Plymouth Argyle but did not make an appearance until the following week when he came on as a late substitute in the South Wales derby against Swansea City on 6 December. Despite his return, he made just two more appearances for the side during the rest of the season. In the 2009–10 season Scimeca made his 400th career appearance against his former club Aston Villa on 23 September 2009 in the League Cup. He returned to the starting line-up on 5 December in a 1–0 win over Preston North End and played in the following game against his former club West Bromwich Albion, where Cardiff won 2–0. After suffering a recurrence of a groin injury, Scimeca announced his retirement as a player on 17 December 2009.

Personal life
Scimeca joined the veteran's team of his home town club, Leamington,  in the Central Warwickshire Over 35's Premier League in 2013. In April 2015 he joined Solihull Moors in a role coaching youth players.

Scimeca now works as a property investor.

Career statistics

As of 17 December 2009

Honours
Cardiff City
FA Cup runner-up: 2007–08

References

External links
Riccardo Scimeca player profile at cardiffcityfc.co.uk
Riccardo Scimeca player profile at wba.co.uk
Riccardo Scimeca player profile at lcfc.co.uk

English footballers
England B international footballers
England under-21 international footballers
Association football defenders
Association football midfielders
Aston Villa F.C. players
Nottingham Forest F.C. players
Leicester City F.C. players
West Bromwich Albion F.C. players
Cardiff City F.C. players
Premier League players
Sportspeople from Leamington Spa
English people of Italian descent
1975 births
Living people
Association football utility players
English Football League players